Robert Gausterer (born 11 May 1928) was an Austrian boxer. He competed in the men's flyweight event at the 1948 Summer Olympics. At the 1948 Summer Olympics in London, he lost his only bout to Han Soo-ann of South Korea in the Round of 32.

References

External links
 

1928 births
Possibly living people
Austrian male boxers
Olympic boxers of Austria
Boxers at the 1948 Summer Olympics
Place of birth missing
Flyweight boxers
20th-century Austrian people